Bage may refer to:

Asia Minor
 Bage (Lydia), a town of ancient Lydia

Brazil
 Bagé, a city in Rio Grande do Sul, Brazil
 Grêmio Esportivo Bagé, usually known simply as Bagé, a football team in Bagé, Rio Grande do Sul
 Bagé River, in state of Acre, Brazil

France
 Canton of Bâgé-le-Châtel, in the department of Ain that includes
 Bâgé-la-Ville, a commune
 Bâgé-le-Châtel, a commune
 Saint-André-de-Bâgé, a commune
 Lac de Bage, in the department of Aveyron

People
 Charles Bage (1751–1822), designer of the first ever iron framed building
 Edward Frederick Robert Bage (1888–1915), engineer in the Royal Australian Engineers and polar explorer
 Robert Bage (1728–1801), English novelist

See also 
 Bages (disambiguation)